Julio Cesar Solano (born January 8, 1960 in Agua Blanca, El Seibo, Dominican Republic), is a former professional baseball player who pitched in Major League Baseball from 1983–89 and in the Chinese Professional Baseball League between 1992 and 1999.

External links
 Baseball Reference

1960 births
Dominican Republic expatriate baseball players in the United States
Houston Astros players

Living people
Major League Baseball pitchers
Major League Baseball players from the Dominican Republic
Seattle Mariners players
St. Paul Saints players
Acereros de Monclova players
Asheville Tourists players
Calgary Cannons players
Charlotte Knights players
Dominican Republic expatriate baseball players in Canada
Dominican Republic expatriate baseball players in Mexico
Dominican Republic expatriate baseball players in Taiwan
Guerreros de Oaxaca players
Mercuries Tigers players
Petroleros de Poza Rica players
Sinon Bulls players
Tucson Toros players
Wei Chuan Dragons players